, son of Kaneharu, was a kugyō or Japanese court noble of the Edo period (1603–1868). He held regent positions sesshō from 1712 to 1716 and kampaku from 1716 to 1722. He married a daughter of Emperor Go-Sai; the couple had three sons, Morotaka, Yukinori and Naozane, and a daughter who later became a consort of Tokugawa Yoshimichi, fourth head of Owari Domain later known as Zuisho-in.

Family
Father: Kujō Kaneharu
Mother: Tokihime
Wife: Imperial Princess Mashiko (1669-1738)
concubine: unknown
Children:
 Kujō Morotaka by Mashiko
 Kujō Yukinori by Concubine later adopted by Mashiko
 Kujō Naozane by Mashiko
 Kujo Sukeko married Tokugawa Yoshimichi by Mashiko

References
 

1669 births
1729 deaths
Fujiwara clan
Kujō family